Robert William Speaight  (1904 – 1976) was a British actor and writer, and the brother of George Speaight, the puppeteer.

Speaight studied under Elsie Fogerty at the Central School of Speech and Drama, then based in the Royal Albert Hall, London.  He was an early performer (from 1927) in radio plays.  He came to prominence as Becket in the first production of T. S. Eliot's Murder in the Cathedral. He went on to Shakespearean roles and to direct. He played the title role in the first broadcast in 1941-42 of the radio drama The Man Born to Be King.

He also wrote criticism and essays, works on the theatre and biography.  He was a Roman Catholic convert, and biographer of Hilaire Belloc and Eric Gill. In the case of Gill, a personal friend, he suppressed material about Gill's sexual interests, which would come out only in the 1989 biography by Fiona MacCarthy.

He married the Welsh actress Evelyn Bowen, with whom he had a son; they separated in 1939. Evelyn later married the celebrated Irish writer Frank O'Connor, with whom she had three children.

Works
Mutinous Wind (1932)
The Lost Hero (1934) novel
Nurse Cavell (1934) play, role of the German spy in C.S. Forester's play about the life of Edith Cavell
Legend of Helena Vaughan (1936) novel
The Angel in the Mist (1936)
St. Thomas of Canterbury (1938)
Acting: its idea and tradition (1939)
The Unbroken Heart (1939)
Since 1939 - Drama, the Novel, Poetry, Prose Literature (1949) with John Hayward, Henry Reed, Stephen Spender – earlier as pamphlet Drama Since 1939 (1947)
George Eliot (1954)
William Poel and the Elizabethan Revival (1954)
Nature in Shakespearian Tragedy (1955)
Life of Hilaire Belloc (1957)
Letters from Hilaire Belloc (1958) editor
Christian Theatre (1960) volume 124 in the 20th Century Encyclopedia of Catholicism
William Rothenstein: The Portrait of an Artist in His Time (1962)
Ronald Knox: The Priest, The Writer (1965) with Thomas Corbishley
The Life of Eric Gill (1966)
Teilhard de Chardin: A Biography (1967)
Teilhard de Chardin: Re-Mythologization. Three Papers (1970) with Robert V. Wilshire and J. V. Langmead Casserley
Vanier: Soldier, Diplomat and Governor General; A Biography (1970) on Georges Vanier
The Property Basket. Recollections of a Divided Life (1970) autobiography
A Bridges-Adams Letter Book (1971) editor
Essays by Divers Hands Vol. XXXVII (1972) editor 
Shakespeare on the Stage; an Illustrated History of Shakespearian Performance (1973)
Georges Bernanos: A Study of the Man and the Writer (1974)
The Companion Guide to Burgundy (1975)
François Mauriac: A Study of the Writer and the Man (1976)
Shakespeare - the Man and his Achievement (1977)

Recordings
The Love Song of J. Alfred Prufrock(T. S. Eliot)
The Hollow Men (T. S. Eliot)
The Waste Land (T. S. Eliot)
Ash Wednesday (T. S. Eliot)
Thomas a-Becket's Sermon from Murder in the Cathedral (T. S. Eliot)
Four Quartets (T. S. Eliot)

Filmography
 London 1942 (1943) - narrator

References

English male radio actors
English biographers
English literary critics
1904 births
1976 deaths
20th-century biographers
20th-century British male actors
Commanders of the Order of the British Empire